Abdurrahman Küçük (born 10 February 1942) is a Turkish alpine skier. He competed in two events at the 1964 Winter Olympics.

References

1942 births
Living people
Turkish male alpine skiers
Olympic alpine skiers of Turkey
Alpine skiers at the 1964 Winter Olympics
People from Sarıkamış
20th-century Turkish people